Karol Kulisz (12 June 1873 in Dzięgielów – 8 May 1940 in Buchenwald) was Polish Lutheran pastor, revivalist and the founder of charity institutions.

During the Nazi occupation, Kulisz was interned in the concentration camp in Skrochovice near Opava. He was later moved to Buchenwald concentration camp, where he was killed on 8 May 1940.

References

Further reading
Kulisz Karol, ks. (1873–1940). In: Jan Szturc, Ewangelicy w Polsce. Słownik biograficzny XVI–XX w., Bielsko-Biała 1998, pp. 164–165

External links
 Biography (Tercentenary of Jesus Church in Teschen Webpage)

1873 births
1940 deaths
People from Cieszyn County
Polish Lutheran clergy
People from Cieszyn Silesia
Polish people who died in Buchenwald concentration camp
Polish civilians killed in World War II
20th-century Lutheran clergy
Founders of charities